The drone in a box is an emerging form of autonomous unmanned aerial vehicle (UAV) technology that uses drones that deploy from and return to self-contained landing “boxes.”

Traditional drones, or UAVs, consist of both a non-manned aircraft and some form of ground-based controller. Drone-in-a-box systems, on the other hand, deploy autonomously from a box that also functions as a landing pad and charging base. After carrying out a pre-programmed list of instructions, they return to their “base” to charge and/or upload information.

Stand-alone drone-in-a-box systems are composed of three main components: a ground station that charges and shelters the drone, the drone itself, and a computer management system that allows the operator to interact with the system, including multiple drones. The ground station also provides battery charging and conducts health checks, and can be made of either metal or carbon fibre.

History 

The first attempted use of drone-in-a-box technology involving a ground state was by the US Air Force in 1968 using a high-altitude SIGINT project called Compass Dwell by the Air Force Security Services.

The AFSS hoped to solve two problems they faced with the Combat Dawn program: high RPV development costs and high operations and maintenance costs.

Compass Dwell was optionally piloted and designed to be disassembled and packed into an Air Force C-141 Starlifter Jet Transport, an effort to solve the deployment problems inherent in previous helicopter recovery methods.

This technology was an important way for the continental US to respond to any spot on the globe, enhancing the country's weapon systems.

Ultimately, Compass Dwell ended up not catching on because of foreign airspace control restrictions and the propeller design, which went against the Air Force's idea of a futuristic, unpiloted plane. The project was more exploratory than a legitimate candidate for adoption.

Automated commercial drone solution, Airobotics, is the first in the world to be granted authorization to fly fully automated drones without a pilot, allowing for Beyond Visual Line of Sight (BVLOS) commercial drone operations, in 2017. The first flight by an automated drone was performed by Airobotics’ fully automated drone system at Intel in 2017.

In 2018, multinational Italy-based manufacturer and distributor of electricity and gas Enel completed an industrial deployment of an autonomous drone-in-box system to carry out round-the-clock operations at their Torrevaldaliga Nord power plant facility.

In December 2020, The United States Air Force announced that The 60th Air Mobility Wing, 60th Security Forces Squadron, in conjunction with Easy Aerial, a commercial provider of autonomous drone-based monitoring solutions, had developed and deployed the first automated drone-in-a-box monitoring and perimeter security system for a United States Air Force (USAF) installation

Uses

Space 
In 2021 NASA deployed the Perseverance rover to Mars with the Ingenuity drone attached to it.  The Ingenuity drone was released on Patriots Day (April 19) 2021 and completed its first flight.  By operating the first mobile drone base in our solar system NASA is able to survey a much larger area than possible with just the rover.

Military 
Drone-in-a-box systems have been a focus of interest for militaries as a less expensive and less dangerous alternative to human-led communications, resupply, and offensive missions.

In January 2017, the Department of Defense and Strategic Capabilities Office completed a successful demonstration of an autonomous “swarm” of “micro-drones” at China Lake, California. 
In February 2017, the US Marine Corps ran a drone-in-a-box trial to test the viability of using both autonomous helicopters and smaller drones to resupply front-line troops without the need for a human pilot.

Sea and port terminals 
Autonomous, drone-in-a-box systems have been used to survey the progress of construction and capture visuals during the construction of the Gulf Port in Haifa, Israel.

In 2018, CERTUS Port Automation signed an agreement to deploy the autonomous drone-in-a-box solution to enhance port security, becoming the first company in the sector to embrace the technology.

Security 
Drone-in-a-box technologies have been used to bolster security in commercial and military applications, automatically deploying when alarms are tripped and providing close-up footage or carrying out scheduled patrols.

Additionally, companies have used drone-in-a-box technologies to support security at large events

Agriculture 
Companies have also embraced drone-in-a-box technology to survey farms and golf courses by using multispectral cameras that can be tuned to respond to specific light wavelengths, including some infrared. Using these cameras fixed on drone-in-a-box systems, drones can detect health-related changes in vegetation.

Utilities 
Drone-in-a-box solutions are used today to support operations at power plants, capturing aerial video and data to be streamed to personnel in real time. 
The scheduled missions can enable human/vehicle detection, alert operators to gas/water leaks and monitor for other maintenance abnormalities. 
In 2018, Israel-based Percepto partnered with Italian electricity and gas provider Enel to launch their on-site autonomous drone system at the Torrevaldaliga Nord power plant.

References 

Unmanned aerial vehicles